These are the official results of the Women's 200 metres event at the 1993 IAAF World Championships in Stuttgart, Germany. There were a total number of 50 participating athletes, with seven qualifying heats and the final held on Thursday 1993-08-19.

Final

Semifinals
Held on Thursday 1993-08-19

Quarterfinals
Held on Tuesday 1993-08-17

Qualifying heats
Held on Tuesday 1993-08-17

See also
 1992 Women's Olympic 200 metres

References
 Results

 
200 metres at the World Athletics Championships
1993 in women's athletics